Daily Guardian or The Daily Guardian may refer to:

Daily Guardian (Iloilo), the Philippines 
Daily Guardian (India), sister newspaper of The Sunday Guardian
Daily Guardian (Sydney), Australia
Nottingham Daily Guardian, former name of the Nottingham Guardian, England